No Dirty Names is a 1966 album by artist Dave Van Ronk. It features the first recorded version of Bob Dylan's song "The Old Man".

Reception

Writing for Allmusic, critic Richie Unterberger wrote of the album "While this is certainly among the more obscure of Dave Van Ronk's early LPs (none of which were exactly big sellers), it's one of the better ones. It's not radically different from most of the folk-blues albums he made in his early career. But there's a little more variety to the arrangements and repertoire than usual, with just as much of Van Ronk's growling gruff voice as always".

Track listing
"One Meatball" (Josh White) – 3:04
"One Of These Days" (Mose Allison) – 2:55
"Song Of The Wandering Aengus" (words by William Butler Yeats, music by Travis Edmonson; mistakenly attributed to Judy Collins) – 5:25
"Keep It Clean" (Charley Jordan; not credited on the album) – 2:27
"Zen Koans Gonna Rise Again" (Dave Van Ronk) – 3:39
"Freddie" (Mance Lipscomb) – 2:05
"Statesboro Blues" (Blind Willie McTell) – 2:12
"Midnight Hour" Blues (Leroy Carr) – 4:55
"Bout A Spoonful" (Gary Davis) – 2:18
"Mean World Blues" (Niela Horn) – 2:19
"Blues Chante" (Dizzy Gillespie) – 2:40
"The Old Man" (Bob Dylan) – 1:33
"Alabama Song" (Bertold Brecht, Kurt Weill, arr. Dave Van Ronk) – 5:19
All tracks arranged by Van Ronk

Personnel
Dave Van Ronk – vocals, guitar
Dave Woods – guitar
Chuck Israels – bass
Barry Kornfield – organ
Terri Van Ronk – scream
John Court – scream

Production notes
Val Valentin – engineer
Jack Anesh – cover design
Charles Stewart – cover photograph
Jerry Schoenbaum – production supervisor

References

1966 albums
Dave Van Ronk albums
Verve Records albums